The Sporting Duchess is a lost 1920 American silent drama film directed by George Terwilliger and starring Alice Joyce. It is based on the 1895 play The Sporting Duchess by Henry Hamilton, Cecil Raleigh, and Augustus Thomas. It was produced and released by the Vitagraph Company of America.

Cast
Alice Joyce as Muriel, Duchess of Desborough
Percy Marmont as Douglas, Duke of Desborough
Gustav von Seyffertitz as Major Roland Mostyn
Edith Campbell as Mrs. Delmaine
Lionel Pape as Captain Cyprian Streatfield
John Goldsworthy as Rupert Leigh
Dan Comfort as Harold
May McAvoy as Mary Alymer
Robert Agnew as Dick Hammond
William H. Turner as Joseph Aylmer
Edward Keenan as Jockey
C. T. Elmer

References

External links

1920 films
American silent feature films
Lost American films
American films based on plays
Vitagraph Studios films
Films directed by George Terwilliger
American black-and-white films
Films set in England
Silent American drama films
1920 drama films
1920 lost films
1920s American films
1920s English-language films